Boldon Community Association F.C. is an association football club that plays in the Northern Football League.  The club was founded as Boldon Villa, joining the Wearside Football League as a founder member in 1892.  They were later known as Boldon Villa and Boldon Colliery Welfare.  In 1976 the club name was renamed Boldon Community Association.
The league title was won in 1953, 1955, 1975 and 1997 
They  were promoted from the Wearside League to the Northern League in 2021.
They made their debut in the Northern Football League in 1-1 draw with Horden Community Welfare.

Goalkeeper Sam Bartram played for the club before joining Charlton Athletic.

References

Northern Football League
Football clubs in Tyne and Wear
Wearside Football League
Mining association football teams in England
Football clubs in England
1892 establishments in England
Association football clubs established in 1892